This list is concerned with severe and abnormal power outages which caused major power failures due to damage to a single thermal power station itself or its connections which take a significant amount of time - months or years to repair.

Whilst any electric grid is vulnerable to instability after the loss of a large generating source or transmission line, this can generally be dealt with without serious inconvenience to customers. However some power stations can be exceptionally large in respect to connected grid capacity so that any failure for these proportionally large stations can be more problematic than the failure of a typically sized station.

List of failures

See also
 Dam failure
 List of power outages
 Hydroelectricity
 List of hydroelectric power station failures
 Thermal power station

References

Thermal power station failures